The Vatican Museums are the public museums of the Vatican City. They display works from the immense collection amassed by the Catholic Church and the papacy throughout the centuries, including several of the most well-known Roman sculptures and most important masterpieces of Renaissance art in the world. The museums contain roughly 70,000 works, of which 20,000 are on display, and currently employ 640 people who work in 40 different administrative, scholarly, and restoration departments.

Pope Julius II founded the museums in the early 16th century. The Sistine Chapel, with its ceiling and altar wall decorated by Michelangelo, and the Stanze di Raffaello (decorated by Raphael) are on the visitor route through the Vatican Museums.

In 2020, due to the COVID-19 pandemic, the Vatican Museums were visited by only 1,300,000 persons, a drop of 81 percent from the number of visitors in 2019, but still enough to rank the museums fourth among the most-visited art museums in the world.

There are 24 galleries, or rooms, in total, with the Sistine Chapel, notably, being the last room visited within the Museum.

History
The Vatican Museums trace their origin to a single marble sculpture, purchased in the 16th century: Laocoön and His Sons was discovered on 14 January 1506, in a vineyard near the basilica of Santa Maria Maggiore in Rome. Pope Julius II sent Giuliano da Sangallo and Michelangelo, who were working at the Vatican, to examine the discovery. On their recommendation, the Pope immediately purchased the sculpture from the vineyard owner. The Pope put the sculpture, which represents the Trojan priest Laocoön and his two sons, Antiphantes and Thymbraeus being attacked by giant serpents, on public display at the Vatican exactly one month after its discovery.

Benedict XIV founded the Museum Christianum, and some of the Vatican collections formed the Lateran Museum, which Pius IX founded by decree in 1854.

The museums celebrated their 500th anniversary in October 2006 by permanently opening the excavations of a Vatican Hill necropolis to the public.

On 1 January 2017, Barbara Jatta became the Director of the Vatican Museums, replacing Antonio Paolucci who had been director since 2007.

Pinacoteca Vaticana

The art gallery was housed in the Borgia Apartment until Pius XI ordered construction of a dedicated building. The new building, designed by Luca Beltrami, was inaugurated on 27 October 1932. The museum's paintings include:

  Giotto: Stefaneschi Triptych
  Olivuccio di Ciccarello: Opere di Misericordia
  Filippo Lippi: Marsuppini Coronation
  Giovanni Bellini: Pietà
  Melozzo da Forlì: Sixtus IV Appointing Platina as Prefect of the Vatican Library
  Pietro Perugino: Decemviri Altarpiece and San Francesco al Prato Resurrection
Leonardo da Vinci: Saint Jerome in the Wilderness
  Raphael: Madonna of Foligno, Oddi Altarpiece and Transfiguration
  Titian: Frari Madonna
  Antonio da Correggio: Christ in Glory
  Paolo Veronese: The Vision of Saint Helena
  Caravaggio: The Entombment of Christ
  Domenichino, The Last Communion of Saint Jerome
  Nicolas Poussin, The Martyrdom of Saint Erasmus
  Jan Matejko: Sobieski at Vienna

Collection of Modern Religious Art
The Collection of Modern Religious Art was added in 1973 and houses paintings and sculptures from such artists as Carlo Carrà, Giorgio de Chirico, Vincent van Gogh, Paul Gauguin, Marc Chagall, Paul Klee, Salvador Dalí, and Pablo Picasso.

Sculpture museums
The group of museums includes several sculpture museums surrounding the Cortile del Belvedere. These are the Museo Gregoriano Profano, with classical sculpture, and others as below:

Museo Pio-Clementino

The museum takes its name from two popes: Clement XIV, who established the museum, and Pius VI, who brought it to completion. Clement XIV came up with the idea of creating a new museum in Innocent VIII's Belvedere Palace and started the refurbishment work.

Clement XIV founded the Museo Pio-Clementino in 1771; it originally contained artworks of antiquity and the Renaissance. The museum and collection were enlarged by Clement's successor Pius VI. Today, the museum houses works of Greek and Roman sculpture. Some notable galleries are as follows:
 Octagonal Court (aka Belvedere Courtyard and Cortile delle Statue): this was where some of the first ancient classical statues in the papal collections were first displayed. Some of the most famous pieces, the Apollo of the Belvedere and Laocoön and His Sons have been here since the early 1500s.
 Sala Rotonda: shaped like a miniature Pantheon, the room has impressive ancient mosaics on the floors, and ancient statues lining the perimeter, including a gilded bronze statue of Hercules and the Braschi Antinous.
 Greek Cross Gallery (Sala a Croce Greca): with the porphyry sarcophagi of Constance and Saint Helena, daughter and mother of Constantine the Great.
 Gallery of the Statues (Galleria delle Statue): as its name implies, holds various important statues, including Sleeping Ariadne and the bust of Menander. It also contains the Barberini Candelabra.
 Gallery of the Busts (Galleria dei Busti) Many ancient busts are displayed.
 Cabinet of the Masks (Gabinetto delle Maschere). The name comes from the mosaic on the floor of the gallery, found in Villa Adriana, which shows ancient theater masks. Statues are displayed along the walls, including the Three Graces.
 Sala delle Muse: houses the statue group of Apollo and the nine muses, uncovered in a Roman villa near Tivoli in 1774, as well as statues by important ancient Greek or Roman sculptors. The centerpiece is the Belvedere Torso, revered by Michelangelo and other Renaissance men.
 Sala degli Animali: so named because of the many ancient statues of animals.

Museo Chiaramonti

This museum was founded in the early 19th century by Pius VII, whose surname before his election as Pope was Chiaramonti. The museum consists of a large arched gallery in which are exhibited several statues, sarcophagi and friezes. The New Wing, or Braccio Nuovo, built by Raffaele Stern, houses statues including the Augustus of Prima Porta, the Doryphoros, and The River Nile. It is in the Neoclassical style and has a wide arched roof with skylights. The Galleria Lapidaria forms part of the Museo Chiaramonti, and contains over 3,000 stone tablets and inscriptions. It is accessible only with special permission, usually for the purpose of academic study.

Museo Gregoriano Etrusco

Founded by Gregory XVI in 1837, this museum has nine galleries and houses Etruscan pieces, coming from archaeological excavations in the territory of the Papal State as well as other works already held in the Vatican.  The collection include vases, sarcophagus, bronzes, terracotta, ceramics as well as works from the Falcioni and  Guglielmi Collections.

Museo Gregoriano Egiziano

This museum houses a large collection of artifacts from Ancient Egypt and also many Egyptian works of Roman production in nine rooms.  The Carlo Grassi Collection of bronzes is part of the collection.  Such material includes papyruses, sarcophagi, mummies, sculptures and reproductions of the Book of the Dead.

Vatican Historical Museum
The Vatican Historical Museum was founded in 1973 at the behest of Paul VI, and was initially hosted in environments under the Square Garden. In 1987, it moved to the main floor of the Lateran Palace, where it opened in March 1991.

Highlights

 The red marble papal throne, formerly in the Basilica of Saint John Lateran.
 Roman sculpture, tombstones, and inscriptions, including the Early Christian Sarcophagus of Junius Bassus and Dogmatic sarcophagus, and the epitaph of Lucius Cornelius Scipio Barbatus.
 The Raphael Rooms with many works by Raphael and his workshop, including the masterpiece The School of Athens (1509–1511).
 The Niccoline Chapel.
 The Sistine Chapel, including the Sistine Chapel ceiling (gallery).
 The Gallery of Maps: topographical maps of the whole of Italy, painted on the walls by friar Ignazio Danti of Perugia, commissioned by Gregory XIII (1572–1585). It remains the world's largest pictorial geographical study.
 The frescoes and other works in the Borgia Apartment built for the Borgia pope Alexander VI.
 The Bramante Staircase is a double spiral staircase designed by Giuseppe Momo in 1932. The staircase has two parts, a double helix, and is of shallow incline, being a stepped ramp rather than a true staircase. The balustrade around the ramp is of ornately worked metal.

Visitors

See also
Accademia, Venice
Index of Vatican City–related articles
List of most visited art museums
Uffizi, Florence

References

Further reading
 G. Spinola, Il Museo Pio-Clementino (3 vols., 1996, 1999, 2004)
 G. B. Visconti and E. Q. Visconti, Il Museo Pio-Clementino Descritto (8 vols., 1782–1792)

 Peter Rohrbacher: Völkerkunde und Afrikanistik für den Papst. Missionsexperten und der Vatikan 1922–1939 in: Römische Historische Mitteilungen 54 (2012), 583–610.

External links

 
 Vatican Museums official on-line ticket office
 Official English information
 On-line arts Catalogue
 Vatican Museum's 360 degree panorama virtual tour
 Vatican Museum's On-line bookshop

 
1506 establishments in the Papal States
Art museums and galleries in Rome
Art museums established in 1506
Museums in Vatican City
Museums of ancient Greece
Museums of ancient Rome
Museums of Dacia
National museums
National galleries
Organizations established in the 1500s
Vatican City culture
Double spiral staircases
Rome Q. XIV Trionfale
Christian museums